Junius Licinius Balbus (ca. 180 - after 238) was a Roman Senator who served as a Suffect Consul.

Family
He is known for being the husband of Antonia Gordiana, daughter of Gordian I and sister of Gordian II, and being the father of the Roman emperor Gordian III. Or so the Historia Augusta claims; modern historians dismiss this identification of the husband of Antonia Gordian and father of the child emperor. 

According to the Historia Augusta, Balbus was the son of Junius Licinius Balbus, a man of consular rank and his wife, Servilia the daughter of the Roman nobles Ceionia Plautia, sister of Lucius Verus, and Quintus Servilius Pudens. Although Antonia Gordiana married an unnamed Roman Senator, modern historians suspect this connection to the Antonine dynasty to be a genealogical fabrication by the anonymous author of the Historia Augusta.

Family tree

References

Sources
 Christian Settipani, Continuité gentilice et continuité sénatoriale dans les familles sénatoriales romaines à l'époque impériale, 2000

2nd-century Romans
3rd-century Romans
Junii
Licinii
Nerva–Antonine dynasty
Year of birth uncertain
180s births
3rd-century deaths
Year of birth unknown
Year of death unknown
Gordian dynasty